Acedo is a surname. Notable people with the surname include:

 Carmen Acedo (born 1975), Spanish rhythmic gymnast
 Domingo Acedo (1898–1980), Spanish footballer
 Jérémy Acedo (born 1987), French footballer
 Manuel Aznar Acedo (1916–2001), Spanish journalist and radio personality

References